Michael Neumann may refer to:

 Michael Neumann, academic and philosopher, writer on the Israel-Palestine conflict
Michael Neander (originally Neumann) (1529 – 1581) was a German teacher, mathematician, medical academic
Michael Neumann Architecture, designers of Martin + Osa stores
 Michael Neumann (politician), former Senator of Hamburg
 Mikey Neumann

See also
 Michael Newman (disambiguation)